The Appalachian miner bee (Andrena alleghaniensis) is a species of miner bee in the family Andrenidae. Another common name for this species is Alleghany andrena. It is found in North America.

References

Further reading

External links

 

alleghaniensis
Articles created by Qbugbot
Insects described in 1907